Richard Millman may refer to:

 Dick Millman, CEO of Bell Helicopter
 Richard Millman (historian), American historian